The 2022–23 season is Manchester United's 31st season in the Premier League and their 48th consecutive season in the top flight of English football. In addition to the domestic league, they are also competing in the FA Cup and the UEFA Europa League. This was the club's first season under the management of Erik ten Hag. They won the EFL Cup, the club's first competitive trophy since winning the 2017 UEFA Europa League final.

There was a mid-season break for the 2022 FIFA World Cup in Qatar, with the last match being played on 13 November 2022. The team's first match after the World Cup was in the EFL Cup on 21 December 2022, following the World Cup final on 18 December.

Pre-season and friendlies
United confirmed the first of their tour destinations, travelling to Bangkok, Thailand and Melbourne, Australia to face Liverpool in the Bangkok Century Cup, Melbourne Victory and Crystal Palace. A third friendly in Australia was later added, against Aston Villa. A trip to Norway was also confirmed for a fixture against Atlético Madrid. A home match, Erik ten Hag's first as United manager, was confirmed against Rayo Vallecano for 31 July.

United began the tour with a 4–0 win over rivals Liverpool; goals from Jadon Sancho, Fred and Anthony Martial put them 3–0 up by half-time, before Facundo Pellistri added a fourth less than 15 minutes from the end. The tour resumed in Australia, where United came back from a goal down – scored by Chris Ikonomidis – to beat Melbourne Victory 4–1; goals from Scott McTominay, Martial, Marcus Rashford and an own goal from Victory youngster Edmond Lupancu maintained United's 100% start to pre-season. On 19 July, United led Crystal Palace 3–0 first via Martial, Rashford, and Sancho before a goal from Joel Ward pulled one back for the London club. Four days later, United led Aston Villa 2–0 in the first half via Sancho and a Matty Cash own goal before goals from Leon Bailey and Calum Chambers equalised for the Birmingham club. A week later, United suffered their first defeat in pre-season against Atlético Madrid, following a late goal from João Félix. The next day, United played another Madrid club, Rayo Vallecano. Amad Diallo scored first early in the second half before Álvaro García equalised nine minutes later.

During the break for the 2022 FIFA World Cup, Manchester United had a week-long training camp in Cádiz, Spain, highlighted by a friendly match against Cádiz CF at Nuevo Mirandilla on 7 December. A second friendly was played against Real Betis at the Estadio Benito Villamarín in Seville three days later. United lost both matches, going down 4–2 to Cádiz and 1–0 to Real Betis.

Premier League

Matches
The 2022–23 Premier League fixtures were released on 16 June 2022.

The league season began with a home loss against Brighton & Hove Albion on 7 August. Pascal Groß scored twice in the first half for Brighton before they conceded an own goal by Alexis Mac Allister in the second to give United their first ever home defeat to Brighton. Named in the starting line-up, Lisandro Martínez and Christian Eriksen made their debuts for United, as did Tyrell Malacia, who came on as a substitute. United then suffered another defeat to Brentford, the first time they had started a league campaign with consecutive losses since the 1992–93 season. Josh Dasilva, Mathias Jensen, Ben Mee and Bryan Mbeumo all scored without reply before the clock had reached 38 minutes. The rest of the game went goalless, but it meant United went bottom of the league table. This was United's seventh straight away defeat in the league, their worst streak since a run of 10 in the 1936–37 season, which ended in relegation from the First Division. That season, United lost both of their meetings with Brentford: 4–0 away on 10 October 1936 and 3–1 on 13 February 1937; those were United's most recent defeats to Brentford prior to this. Erik ten Hag became the first United manager since John Chapman in 1921 to lose his opening two games in charge of the club.

On 22 August, United achieved their first league victory of the season, a 2–1 home win against rivals Liverpool. Jadon Sancho scored 15 minutes into the first half and Marcus Rashford early in the second, before Mohamed Salah scored a consolation goal that made him the fixture's outright top scorer with 10 goals. This was United's first league win against Liverpool since March 2018. In the next match, United visited Southampton on 27 August. Bruno Fernandes scored the game's only goal with a volley as United won their first away match in the league and won back-to-back league matches for the first time since February 2022. Casemiro made his United debut when he came on as a substitute in the 80th minute. On 1 September, United achieved a second away victory as they won 1–0 against Leicester City. Sancho scored the only goal after 23 minutes as United won three league matches in a row for the first time since December 2021. On 4 September, United obtained their fourth consecutive league victory with a 3–1 home win against rivals Arsenal. Antony scored the opening goal 35 minutes into his United debut, before Bukayo Saka equalised at the hour mark. Rashford then scored two goals in order to secure victory against Arsenal, who were on top of the league table, having started the season on a five-match winning streak.

Following the death of Queen Elizabeth II on 8 September, all league matches on the weekend of 10–12 September were postponed. United then announced that their home game against rivals Leeds United, originally scheduled for 18 September, would also be postponed due to a police shortage ahead of the Queen's state funeral.

United's break from league action was further extended by the September international window, which meant their first Premier League match in almost a month saw them face Manchester City away in the derby on 2 October. Erling Haaland and Phil Foden each scored twice for City in the first half to give the hosts a 4–0 lead at the break. Antony scored for United early in the second half, but Haaland and Foden both scored again to complete their hat-tricks before Anthony Martial came on to score two late goals for United. With a total of nine goals, it was the highest-scoring Manchester derby of all time. The next week, United travelled to play Everton. Alex Iwobi opened the scoring after just five minutes, but Everton led only briefly before Antony scored the equaliser, his third consecutive league game scoring. An injury to Martial saw him replaced by Cristiano Ronaldo just before the half-hour mark, who only took 15 minutes to score the winning goal, assisted by Casemiro. It was Ronaldo's first open-play goal of the season and the 700th overall in his club career. On the next match United faced Newcastle United in their first home league game in six weeks. Both teams had plenty of chances but ultimately had to settle for a goalless draw. Three days later, they hosted Tottenham Hotspur. Fred scored his first goal of the season before Fernandes sealed the win.

They visited Chelsea three days later in the last game against a fellow top six side in 2022. Following a foul in the penalty area by Scott McTominay, Jorginho slotted home the penalty three minutes from time, but Casemiro then headed home in the fourth minute of stoppage time – his first United goal – as United extended their unbeaten league record against the West London side to 10 matches, dating back to November 2017. United hosted West Ham United on 30 October. Rashford scored his 100th club goal, which proved to be the sole goal of the game. The match was held 85 years to the start of United's run of including academy graduates in their matchday squads, which by this point already reached 4,163 consecutive matches. A week later United travelled to Aston Villa, in their manager Unai Emery's first Premier League game since his days with Arsenal. A seventh-minute goal from Leon Bailey and a free kick from Lucas Digne four minutes later gave Villa an early two-goal lead, before a shot from Luke Shaw was deflected into his own net by Jacob Ramsey. Four minutes into the second half, Ramsey redeemed himself and made it 3–1. This was United's first loss at Villa Park in all competitions since October 1999, and the first in the league since August 1995. The following Sunday saw United travel to West London to face Fulham for the last Premier League game prior to the World Cup. Eriksen opened the scoring with his first goal for the club with less than 15 minutes played, but as the game passed the hour mark, former United winger Daniel James scored from close range to equalise. Alejandro Garnacho, who was subbed on for Martial 11 minutes later, scored the winning goal in the final minute of added time.

United's first action after the World Cup was a Boxing Day fixture against Nottingham Forest. Following up a corner kick from Eriksen, Rashford scored the opening goal after just 18 minutes, four minutes before setting up for Martial. Fred scored the third goal three minutes from time following a pass from Casemiro to secure the three points. United's final game of the year saw them play Wolverhampton Wanderers away. Rashford, who was benched for disciplinary reasons, scored the game's only goal to put United into the top four.

United started the new year with a home game against Bournemouth. Goals from Casemiro, Shaw and Rashford gave them a 3–0 win and strengthened the club's grip on the top four. Two weeks later, they welcomed Manchester City to Old Trafford for the second derby of the season. Jack Grealish opened the scoring for City on the hour mark, before Fernandes scored an equaliser in the 78th minute; the goal was initially ruled out for an offside against Rashford, but a VAR review deemed Rashford not to have been interfering with play. Rashford then scored the winner four minutes later; it was his eighth goal in his last seven appearances. The win also extended United's winning run to nine in all competitions. Four days later, United travelled to Crystal Palace. Their nine-game winning run was brought to an end after Fernandes' first half goal was cancelled out by a second half stoppage time free-kick from Michael Olise. This game saw Wout Weghorst made his debut for the club. Four days later, United travelled to league leaders Arsenal. Rashford brought United forward before an equaliser by Eddie Nketiah seven minutes later. Saka put Arsenal in front in the 53rd minute, but Lisandro Martínez scored his first United goal to equalise matters. Nketiah then scored the winner at the 90th minute, extended Arsenal's unbeaten league record this season to 13 matches and home record against United to five league matches; United's most recent league win at the Emirates Stadium was on 2 December 2017.

On 4 February, United faced Crystal Palace. A handball from Will Hughes penalised Palace; Fernandes executed the penalty kick smoothly to open an early lead. Rashford then made it 2–0 after a pass from Shaw. After Casemiro received a red card after an altercation with Hughes, Jeffrey Schlupp halved the deficit in the 76th minute. United made three substitutions afterwards; Marcel Sabitzer—who made his United debut, Victor Lindelöf, and Harry Maguire were subbed on as United successfully defended the lead. Four days later Leeds came visiting right after the dismissal of their head coach Jesse Marsch, with Michael Skubala as his interim replacement. Within a minute, Wilfried Gnonto scored for them. In the 48th minute, Raphaël Varane scored an own goal from Crysencio Summerville's cut-back to double Leeds' lead. Rashford pulled one back 14 minutes later, before Sancho equalised within eight minutes to earn United a point. United visited Leeds the following Sunday. Rashford broke the deadlock with a header at the 80th minute following a cross from Shaw, before Garnacho sealed the win with a strike assisted by Weghorst. David de Gea made history as he became the first keeper to reach 400 Premier League appearances for Manchester United. In the next match, United faced Leicester at Old Trafford. Rashford scored in the 25th minute, breaking his best tally in a season, and doubled the lead in the 56th minute. Sancho then scored five minutes later to secure a 3–0 win. The scoreline meant that De Gea equalled Peter Schmeichel's club record for most clean sheets.

On 5 March, United visited Anfield in search of a first win there since January 2016. Instead, they were trounced by the home side. Braces from each of Cody Gakpo, Darwin Núñez, and the fixture's top scorer Mohamed Salah, as well as a closing goal from Roberto Firmino flew in as Liverpool won 7–0 and broke the fixture's largest win record, a 7–1 thumping of the former Newton Heath on 12 October 1895 in the Second Division. This was also United's joint-biggest ever defeat and the heaviest since Wolverhampton Wanderers thrashed them by the same scoreline in 1931. The following Sunday, United faced Southampton at home. The match ended in a goalless draw after a second red card of the season for Casemiro for a challenge on Theo Walcott, upgraded from a yellow card after an intervention from the video assistant referee.

League table

FA Cup
As a Premier League side, United entered the 2022–23 FA Cup in the Third Round Proper in January 2023. They were drawn against Everton and the match was played at Old Trafford on 6 January 2023 as the first match of the round. Antony opened the scoring after just four minutes, Conor Coady equalised ten minutes later. He then scored an own goal in the second half to give United the lead, before Marcus Rashford scored a third goal from the penalty spot.

In the Fourth Round Proper, they were drawn at home to Championship side Reading. Casemiro scored two goals in five minutes, before Fred scored a third goal with a backheel. Amadou Salif Mbengue scored a consolation goal for the visitors in the 72nd minute.

In the Fifth Round Proper, Manchester United were drawn at home again, this time against West Ham United. Despite falling behind in the 54th minute by Saïd Benrahma, an own goal from Nayef Aguerd levelled the tie in the 77th minute, before two late goals from Alejandro Garnacho and Fred secured the home side's progression to the quarter-finals, and a home tie with Fulham.

In the quarter-finals, United fell behind first when Aleksandar Mitrović scored for Fulham at the 50th minute, his first FA Cup goal. A handball from Willian at the goal line led to a VAR referral, where Fulham manager Marco Silva attempted to influence the referee, which resulted in his dismissal. The referee then granted the penalty kick on review, and red carded Willian for denying a clear goalscoring opportunity. Right after Willian was shown the red card, an enraged Mitrović assaulted referee Chris Kavanagh, prompting his own immediate expulsion. Bruno Fernandes equalised with the penalty. Two minutes later, Marcel Sabitzer backheeled his first United goal following a pass from Luke Shaw. Fernandes secured the victory right before the final whistle assisted by Fred as they secured a fourth consecutive 3–1 cup win and a record 31st FA Cup semi-final. They will be pitted against Brighton & Hove Albion, whom they defeated in the 1983 FA Cup final.

EFL Cup
As United were competing in UEFA competition in 2022–23, they entered the EFL Cup in the third round. They were drawn against Aston Villa, and the match was played at Old Trafford on 10 November 2022. United gave a debut to goalkeeper Martin Dúbravka, who kept a clean sheet in the first half, but within three minutes of the second half starting, United were behind to a goal from Ollie Watkins. Anthony Martial equalised 19 seconds after the ensuing kick-off, only for United to go behind again when Diogo Dalot diverted a ball from Leon Bailey into his own net just after the hour mark. Marcus Rashford equalised six minutes later, before Bruno Fernandes and Scott McTominay sealed the victory.

United received another home draw in the fourth round; they played against Burnley on 21 December 2022. Christian Eriksen opened the scoring in the first half before Rashford added a second after the half-time interval.

In the quarter-finals, Manchester United were drawn at home against the lowest-ranked team remaining in the competition, Charlton Athletic. In the sides' first meeting in nearly 16 years, a first-half goal from Antony followed by two late goals in five minutes from substitute Rashford secured United a place in the semi-finals. The match featured the competitive debuts of Kobbie Mainoo and Facundo Pellistri for the club; the former started and played for an hour while the latter came on as a substitute at 84 minutes and assisted Rashford's first goal. This was also goalkeeper Tom Heaton's first start for the club.

In the semi-finals, United faced Nottingham Forest, whom they defeated in the 1992 final to lift their first League Cup title. In the first leg held at City Ground, Rashford opened the scoring inside six minutes. Wout Weghorst then scored just before half-time, his first goal for the club. Fernandes wrapped up the win with another strike. In the return leg, goals from Anthony Martial and Fred secured a 5–0 aggregate win and a final appearance against Newcastle United.

In the final, Casemiro opened the scoring before Rashford struck the second goal. United clung on to win their sixth League Cup and the club's first trophy since 2017. The 2–0 scoreline was a repeat between the two sides in the 1999 FA Cup final, and also meant that David de Gea surpassed Peter Schmeichel's club record for most clean sheets with 181.

UEFA Europa League

Group stage

Having finished sixth in the 2021–22 Premier League, United qualified for the 2022–23 UEFA Europa League. They entered the competition in the group stage, which was drawn on 26 August 2022, with United in Pot 1 along with Roma, Arsenal, Lazio, Braga, Red Star Belgrade, Dynamo Kyiv and Olympiacos. They were drawn into Group E with Spanish club Real Sociedad, Moldovan champions Sheriff Tiraspol and Cypriot representative Omonia. They last met Sociedad in the 2020–21 UEFA Europa League round of 32, which they won 4–0 away and drew 0–0 at home. They also met in the 2013–14 UEFA Champions League group stage, when United drew 0–0 away and won 1–0 at home. The meetings with Sheriff and Omonia were United's first against teams from either Moldova or Cyprus. The group stage began on 8 September and concluded on 3 November 2022.

Before United's opening group match at home to Real Sociedad, a moment of silence was observed following the death of Queen Elizabeth II earlier that day. Real Sociedad's Brais Méndez scored the only goal of the game from the penalty spot after 59 minutes, following a contentious handball decision against substitute Lisandro Martínez, to give the Spanish side their first ever win over United. For the next match United travelled to Chișinău, where Zimbru Stadium hosted the match instead of Sheriff's regular stadium, Sheriff Stadium, Tiraspol, due to Transnistria's involvement in the Russian invasion of Ukraine. Jadon Sancho opened the scoring before Cristiano Ronaldo scored his first goal of the season via a penalty.

The next match saw United travel to Omonia's GSP Stadium in Nicosia. Despite a heavily dominant United display in the first half, Karim Ansarifard put Omonia into the lead after 34 minutes. Half-time substitutes Rashford and Martial put United 3–1 up before Nikolas Panayiotou scored a late consolation goal for the hosts. The return fixture was played the next week, with Scott McTominay scoring the game's winning goal.

United hosted Sheriff Tiraspol on 27 October, with Alejandro Garnacho making his first senior start for the club. Diogo Dalot scored the opener with a header. It was only his second ever goal for United, and the first since January 2020. Rashford then doubled the lead with another header before Ronaldo ensured United's passage to the Europa League knockout stage. On the final matchday, United needed to win by two goals in their return match against Real Sociedad at Anoeta Stadium to win the group. Garnacho scored his first senior goal for the club in the first half, but there were no further goals, which meant United finished second based on their overall goal difference.

Knockout phase

Having finished second in their group, United played in the Europa League knock-out round playoffs against one of the eight third-placed teams from the UEFA Champions League group stage. There were no other English teams in the draw conducted on 7 November 2022, so all eight opponents were possible: Ajax, Barcelona, Bayer Leverkusen, Juventus, Red Bull Salzburg, Sevilla, Shakhtar Donetsk and Sporting CP. United were drawn first from the group runners-up pot, paired with Barcelona. The two teams have previously met in 13 competitive matches, most notably in the 1991 European Cup Winners' Cup final – which United won 2–1 – and the 2009 and 2011 UEFA Champions League finals, which Barcelona won 2–0 and 3–1, respectively. It is the sides' first meeting since the 2018–19 Champions League quarter-finals, which United lost 4–0 on aggregate. United came on a quest to win away against Barcelona for the first time ever, and almost did it. After Marcos Alonso scored the opener at the 50th minute, it only took two minutes for Marcus Rashford to score the equaliser, his 22nd goal of the campaign. It was his cross that forced Jules Koundé to make a mistake and scored an own goal seven minutes later. However, former Leeds United winger Raphinha, who assisted Alonso for the first goal, scored himself 14 minutes from full time as the teams settled for a 2–2 draw. In the second leg, United went behind after just 18 minutes to a penalty from Robert Lewandowski. Second half goals from Brazilian duo Fred and Antony turned around the match and tie as United secured only their fourth competitive win over Barcelona, and the first since the 2007–08 UEFA Champions League semi-finals.

In the round of 16, United were drawn against another Spanish side in Real Betis, the two clubs' first competitive encounter. In the first leg at Old Trafford, Rashford scored after just six minutes, with Ayoze Pérez equalising 26 minutes later. Second-half goals from Antony, Bruno Fernandes, and Wout Weghorst—his first home goal for United—secured a 4–1 win. In the second leg, a 56th minute goal from Rashford saw United secure a 1–0 win and progression to the quarter-finals with a 5–1 victory on aggregate.

In the quarter-finals, United were paired with yet another Spanish club in Sevilla, Betis's cross-city rival. This is the first time in history that United face four distinctive opponents from the same country in a single European campaign. United are looking to beat the Europa League's most successful side for the first time, having lost the 2017–18 UEFA Champions League round of 16 and 2019–20 UEFA Europa League semi-final ties.

Squad statistics

Transfers

In

Out

Loan in

Loan out

Notes

References

Manchester United F.C. seasons
Manchester United
Manchester United
Manchester United